Elkhan Mammadov (born 26 February 1982, Baku, Azerbaijani SSR, USSR) is a retired  Azerbaijani judoka.

At the 2008 Summer Olympics he was eliminated in the quarterfinals of the 90 kg competition after losing his fight to the upcoming gold medalist Irakli Tsirekidze.  At the 2012 Summer Olympics he was again knocked out by the eventual champion, Song Dae-Nam, this time in the second round.

Mammadov won the gold medal in 2013 at the World Championships held in Rio de Janeiro, defeating Henk Grol, from Netherlands, during the −100 kg final category.

Achievements

References

External links

 
 
 

1982 births
Living people
Azerbaijani male judoka
Judoka at the 2008 Summer Olympics
Judoka at the 2012 Summer Olympics
Olympic judoka of Azerbaijan
World judo champions
Sportspeople from Baku
European Games competitors for Azerbaijan
Judoka at the 2015 European Games
Islamic Solidarity Games medalists in judo
20th-century Azerbaijani people
21st-century Azerbaijani people